Propebela lateplicata is a species of sea snail, a marine gastropod mollusk in the family Mangeliidae.

Description
The length of the shell attains 12 mm.

Distribution
This marine species occurs in the Magellanic Region and off Southern Argentina

References

External links
  Tucker, J.K. 2004 Catalog of recent and fossil turrids (Mollusca: Gastropoda). Zootaxa 682:1–1295.

lateplicata
Gastropods described in 1905